Roxanne Didier Nicholas (born 1992 in Castries) is a St. Lucian dancer and beauty pageant titleholder who was crowned Miss St.Lucia 2014 and represented her home country at Miss Universe 2014.

Early life
Roxanne is a resident of Coubaril, Castries, born and raised in the community. “I have lived in Coubaril all my life with my parents, sister and brother,” she shares.

Her family support has been vital to the successes that she has enjoyed thus far in her endeavors, from her studies, to her self-expression through dance and more recently, her participation in pageantry. “My family, as well as my friends, are incredibly supportive of all my pursuits and I am extremely appreciative. My loved ones always encourage me to do my very best and clearly state that they will be proud of me no matter the outcome,” said Roxanne.

This dancer states that she began exploring this talent at the age of nine at the St Lucia School of Ballet and Modern Dance. Passionate about the art form, Roxanne has indicated that she wishes to pursue advance studies in dance, as well as further develop her potential. “I wish I could have begun my study in dance at a younger age but I plan to further my dance education after I have achieved my first degree,” she commented.

“At the age of eleven,” shared Nicholas, “I became a member of the Avad Dance Ministry as well. Both groups have significantly contributed to the dancer I am today. After my first degree I would like to do my masters degree in dance education. Performing at world stage events would also be a ‘dream come’ true of mine.”

Roxanne is an alumnus of the Ave Maria Girl’s Primary School, the St. Joseph’s Convent and the Sir Arthur Lewis Community College (SALCC). “At the end of my five year secondary education I wrote nine CXC subjects, namely; Mathematics, English Language, Chemistry, Biology, Physics, Geography, Spanish, Principle of Accounts and Information Technology. I was successful in all my subjects,” the reigning Miss Carival shared.

At SALCC, Didier-Nicholas furthered her education in Accounting, Economics, Management Studies and Communication Studies.

Nicholas studied at The University of the West Indies Saint Augustine, Trinidad and Tobago.

Pageantry

Miss St. Lucia Carnival 2011
Nicholas was crowned as Miss St. Lucia Carnival Queen in the year 2011 which is an annual pageant centered on the islands culture of Carnival and Bachannal.

Miss Carival 2012
Nicholas was crowned as Miss Carival in St Vincent in the year 2012.

Miss St. Lucia 2014
Nicholas was crowned Miss St. Lucia 2014 and competed in Miss Universe 2014 in the USA on January 25, 2015.

Miss Universe 2014
Nicholas competed at Miss Universe 2014 pageant but Unplaced.

References

External links
Official Miss St. Lucia Facebook's fans
Nicholas' Facebook

Saint Lucian beauty pageant winners
Living people
1992 births
Miss Universe 2014 contestants
Miss St. Lucia winners